Cookie Clicker is an incremental game created by French programmer Julien "Orteil" Thiennot in 2013. The user initially clicks on a big cookie on the screen, earning a single cookie per click. They can then use their earned cookies to purchase assets such as "cursors" and other "buildings" that automatically produce cookies. Upgrades are also available and can improve the efficiency of clicks and buildings, among many other mechanics that allow the user to earn cookies in different ways. Though the game has no ending, it has hundreds of achievements, and users may aim to reach milestone numbers of cookies.

The game has a dedicated fanbase. Though the original version was coded in one night, Cookie Clicker is regularly updated. It has been widely described as addictive, and has been credited with playing a role in the emergence of idle gaming.

Gameplay

At first, the player clicks on a large cookie on the far left side of the screen, earning one cookie per click. With these cookies, the player can buy new buildings such as cursors, grandmas, farms, mines, factories, banks, temples, and many more that automatically make cookies without needing to click. Prices increase exponentially, each asset costing 15% more than the last-purchased asset of the same type. The player may also purchase upgrades to increase cookie production for these buildings. Golden cookies, small cookies that appear in random locations and fade away after several seconds, appear periodically and grant effects, such as a temporary increase in the rate of production, if clicked before they disappear.

After earning a certain number of cookies, the player can 'ascend', losing their progress but earning heavenly chips and prestige levels. Prestige levels add a permanent boost (+1% per level) to the rate of cookie production in future play-throughs, while heavenly chips can be spent on a wide variety of prestige upgrades. However, the number of cookies needed to unlock the next prestige level goes up proportionally with the cube of the level, becoming harder to attain as more are acquired. Other game mechanics include "wrinklers" (eldritch beasts which reduce cookie production, but can be popped by clicking them, returning all the cookies it digested with interest), Krumblor the Cookie Dragon, mini games, and sugar lumps (which take 24 hours to coalesce and are used to level up buildings and boost their production rate). Achievements can be earned by completing various tasks or goals, such as reaching a certain number of total cookies produced, owning a particular number of buildings of a certain type or clicking a certain number of golden cookies. Upon reaching a certain number of achievements, the player unlocks different colors of milk that appear below the cookie. With "kitten" upgrades, the player earns extra production depending on their total achievements. Additionally, seasonal events occur during their respective holidays which come with more upgrades and cookies to unlock.

The game features geometric growth: the player begins baking handfuls of cookies, but can quickly reach billions of cookies, and eventually attain duodecillions (1039) of cookies or beyond. The game has no clear ending.

Because of the game's relatively simple code, cheats and add-ons are widely available and simply implemented by using browser consoles and bookmarklets.

History
Julien "Orteil" Thiennot created Cookie Clicker on August 8, 2013. Written in a single evening, the game was posted in a link on 4chan, and garnered 50,000 players within hours. A month after the game's initial release, it had over 200,000 players per day. Orteil later wrote that traffic had peaked at 1.5 million hits in one day during August 2013, and by January 2014 Cookie Clicker was still getting a steady 225,000 hits per day. The game has had continual updates since its release, notably the "legacy" update in February 2016 and the "spiritual" update in July 2017. On October 25, 2018, Orteil launched the game's Patreon page, with the intent to develop Cookie Clicker and other Dashnet games becoming a full-time job. On August 8, 2019, the mobile beta for Cookie Clicker was released for Android devices after a long delay.

Cookie Clicker is similar to Cow Clicker, a previously existing idle game created by Ian Bogost. Bogost has called Cookie Clicker "the logical conclusion of Cow Clicker". Orteil later released other idle games such as: Idle Game Maker, a tool allowing customized idle games to be made without coding knowledge; AdventureQuest Dragons, a mobile game created with Artix Entertainment; and NeverEnding Legacy.

Steam release 
On August 8, 2021, Orteil announced on Twitter a Steam release of Cookie Clicker, with the planned release date of September 1, 2021. The game was released on Steam on its originally announced release date. The release also included a soundtrack composed by C418.

Analysis

Impact on idle gaming
In an IGN article, Cookie Clicker is credited as one of the few games to have played a major role in the establishment of the genre of idle gaming (also called incremental gaming). An article in The Kernel describes it as "probably the best-known" game in the genre.

In an issue of Digital Culture & Society, Paolo Ruffino notes that the game is "supposed to be a parody of FarmVille" (a popular game which Ruffino says could be played easily with an algorithm, as the optimal action is always obvious), but that it is "equally addictive". Thus, the game "explores the absence of human agency". Ian Bogost, creator of Cow Clicker, similarly notes that "Cookie Clicker isn't a game for a human, but one for a computer to play while a human watches (or doesn't)." Cookie Clicker has been said by reviewers to be addictive, and its fanbase have been described as "obsessive" and "almost cultish". Roisin Kiberd notes that fans of the game have pointed out that their playing the game is bad for the environment (due to the computers being left on around the clock) and caused reduced efficiency at work.

However, due to their mockingly simple mechanics, idle games are also considered by many of being relatively simple or, as stated in an IGN article, "super dumb". Games such as Cookie Clicker have used this blend of simplicity and complexity to create a new genre that some may not even consider as actual games. Orteil himself described his works as "non-games".

Themes
The game has dark humour in the names and descriptions of some of its upgrades, achievements or mechanics, and generally has themes of dystopia, cosmic horror, and apocalypse. Examples including an achievement titled "Global Warming" (upon owning 100 factories), a news ticker tape reading "New cookie-based religion sweeps the nation." and the "Grandmapocalypse", in which "the screen turns molten red and the central cookie is attacked by 'wrinklers'", and the world at large is implied to have been taken over by a hive mind of mutated grandmothers.

In The Kernel, Kiberd opines that the game is "a parable about how capitalism will destroy itself". Kiberd suggests that Cookie Clicker is "saddling [the concept of fun] with ideas about success, achievement, and productivity", and "uses its own form as a critique of the larger structures of expectation and reward".

Reception
Justin Davis of IGN describes Cookie Clicker as the "greatest Idle Game" and says it "probably achieves the best balance of power yet [...] so that every step of the way you feel like you're flying, generating cookies so much faster than you were before. But you still can't wait until that next major milestone is finally within reach". Boing Boing reviewed Cookie Clicker as a "highly-addictive browser game". Polygon has described the game as "intriguing", and its fan base as "obsessive".  Destructoid emphasizes that it is "centered around the pursuit and accumulation of vast wealth", providing players with  "the illusion of progress, without any substantial advancement actually being made." Another academic work analyzed Cookie Clicker as an object of new media art that subverts "the experimental opacity of digital media" and forces the person experiencing it to "fac[e] the expression of digital historical experience: the broad sense of existential disenfranchisement characterizing so much of the experience of contemporary technology". Sebastian Deterding, a professor of design engineering at Imperial College London, acknowledges that the game exists at one level as a parody and ridicule of Farmville and EverQuest, but said the game transcends this, engaging in gamification of progress, allowing players to "keep at a single 'silly' pursuit for hundreds of hours [engaged in] a real, self-regulatory skill", and that its players can and do play it "out of enlightened existential spite", perhaps including the author who acknowledges baking octillions of cookies over thousands of hours of gameplay, "orders of magnitude more time...than any other video game in my life".

References

External links

 

2013 video games
Browser games
Free online games
Incremental games
Android (operating system) games
IOS games
Single-player video games
Video games about food and drink
Video games developed in France
Cookies in popular culture
Apocalyptic video games